Zacchaeus Chesoni (born c. 1936 - 5 September 1999) was Chief Justice of Kenya and chairman of the Electoral Commission
.
Chesoni hails from the Kabras sub tribe Bamachina clan close to Chimoi area around Webuye.

References

Kenyan judges
Kenyan Luhya people
1999 deaths
Place of birth missing
Chief justices of Kenya
1936 births